Villaquirán may refer to:

Villaquirán de la Puebla, municipality located in the province of Burgos, Castile and León, Spain
Villaquirán de los Infantes, municipality located in the province of Burgos, Castile and León, Spain